Bedford Village may refer to:
Bedford Village Archeological Site
Bedford Village Historic District